Great Western can refer to:

Locations 
 Great Western, Victoria, a town in Victoria, Australia
 Great Western Divide, a long ridge in California's Sierra Nevada Mountains, USA
 Great Western Mountain, a mountain in central Sri Lanka
 Great Western Tiers, a collection of small mountain bluffs in Tasmania, Australia

Railways 
 Great Western Railway, a UK railway company nationalised in 1948 and that has since lent its name to:
 Great Western Main Line, a principal passenger and freight rail route 
 Great Western Railway (train operating company), traded as Great Western Trains until 1998, then First Great Western until 2015
 Great Western Holdings, a company formed in 1994 to bid (successfully) for the Great Western franchise
 Great Western, one of the GWR 3031 Class locomotives that were built for and run on the Great Western Railway
 Great Western Railway (Ontario), originally of Canada West
 Great Western Railway (Saskatchewan), a short line railway in Canada
 Chicago Great Western Railway, US
 Great Western Railroad (Illinois) (1853-1865), predecessor of the Wabash Railroad, US
 Great Western Railroad (Ohio), US
 Great Western Railway of Colorado, US

Businesses and organisations 
 Great Western Ambulance Service, a former NHS emergency services trust in South West England
 Great Western Bank (disambiguation)
 Great Western Brewing Company, located in Saskatoon, Saskatchewan, Canada
 Great Western Hospital, in Swindon, England
 Great Western Hotel (disambiguation), several hotels
 Great Western Mine, a coal mine in South Wales, UK
 Great Western Mine, a mercury mine in California, USA
 Great Western Sugar Company, a sugar company headquartered in Denver, Colorado

Other 
 Sarah A. Bowman (c. 1813-1866), American innkeeper, restaurateur, and madam
 SS Great Western, the first purpose-built trans-Atlantic steamship, 1838
 The Great Western, an album by James Dean Bradfield
 Great Western Chorus of Bristol, a men's a cappella chorus singing primarily in the Barbershop style